Live Dates 2 is the second live album by rock band Wishbone Ash. It remains a sought-after collector's item. The album was recorded partly on dates between 1976 and 1980, including the tour in support of the album Just Testing. It peaked at No. 40 in the UK Albums Chart.

The first 25,000 copies of this album were a double album, with six extra bonus tracks. Subsequent copies of the album contained only tracks 1 to 6. The sleeve only lists the tracks on the first album along with their recording locations:

Hull City Hall (Doctor)

Bristol Colston Hall (Living Proof, The Way Of The World)

Wolverhampton Civic Hall (Runaway, Helpless)

London Hammersmith Odeon (F.U.B.B.)

The tracks on side 1 were recorded in 1980 and those on side 2 in 1978. Dates for the bonus LP are not listed.

The album was also released as two single LPs with the titles Live Dates 2 and Live Dates 2, Additional Tapes.

Track listing
Side 1
"Doctor"   5:47
"Living Proof"   5:55
"Runaway"   3:15
"Helpless"   3:56
Side 2
"F.U.B.B."  9:52
"The Way Of The World"   10:25
Side 3
"Lorelei"   6:28
"Persephone"   8:38
"(In All of My Dreams) You Rescue Me"   6:59
Side 4
"Time Was"   6:49
"Goodbye Baby, Hello Friend"   5:30
"No Easy Road"   7:20

Personnel
Wishbone Ash
Martin Turner -  bass, vocals
Andy Powell -  guitar, vocals
Laurie Wisefield -  guitar, vocals
Steve Upton -  drums
Technical
Produced by: John Sherry, Wishbone Ash
Recorded at Apollo - Glasgow (19 November 1976), City Hall - Sheffield (18 October 1977), Marquee Club - London (19 October 1977), Hammersmith Odeon - London (25 October 1978), Colston Hall - Bristol, England (27 October 1978), Colston Hall - Bristol (16 February 1980), City Hall - Hull (1 June 1980), Civic Hall - Wolverhampton (4 June 1980)

References

1980 live albums
Wishbone Ash live albums
MCA Records live albums
Albums with cover art by Hipgnosis